Winklevoss may refer to:

 Howard Winklevoss (born 1943), American actuary, professor and author
 Cameron Winklevoss (born 1981), American investor, entrepreneur and rower, twin brother of Tyler Winklevoss
 Tyler Winklevoss (born 1981), American investor, entrepreneur and rower, twin brother of Cameron Winklevoss
 Winklevoss Capital Management, cofounded and owned by the two brothers